Trent Barrett (born 18 November 1977) is an Australian professional rugby league football coach who is a former head coach and a former professional rugby league footballer who played in the 1990s, 2000s and 2010s.

He was previously the head coach of the Manly-Warringah Sea Eagles and Canterbury-Bankstown Bulldogs in the National Rugby League. A former Australia international and New South Wales State of Origin representative , he played during the 1990s and 2000s for the Illawarra Steelers before they formed a joint venture with St. George to create the St. George Illawarra Dragons, with whom he won the 2000 Dally M Medal. Barrett also had a two-season spell in the Super League with England's Wigan and was named in 2007's Super League Dream Team before finishing his career back in Australia with the Cronulla-Sutherland Sharks. After co-coaching the St George Illawarra under 20s side and coaching the Country New South Wales rugby league team for four seasons Barrett started coaching in the NRL with the Sea Eagles.

Background
Barrett was born in Temora, New South Wales on 18 November 1977. He is a cousin of Australian rules footballers Luke Breust and Jake Barrett, NRL footballer Liam Martin and Australian water polo player Anthony Martin.

While attending St Gregory's College, Campbelltown, he played for the Australian Schoolboys team in 1995.

Playing career

1990s
Barrett started his professional career in the 1996 ARL season with the Illawarra Steelers.

Within two years he had been selected to play his first State of Origin match.

Barrett was the stand-out player of the 1998 Illawarra Steelers season, top scoring with 18 tries and winning the BHP Medal as player of the year.

His first season at the new joint-venture of the St. George Illawarra Dragons was marred by controversy as the incessant media hype over an alleged feud with Anthony Mundine and whether by playing out of position at half-back was affecting his form. He played at halfback in St. George Illawarra's 1999 NRL Grand Final loss to Melbourne.

2000s

At the end of the 2001 NRL season, he went on the 2001 Kangaroo tour.

He scored 6 tries in 20 games in the 2002 NRL season.

In 2003, while Barrett was captain of St George Illawarra, Nathan Brown who was the coach at the time famously slapped Barrett across the face in a tense sideline spray alongside Lance Thompson. Brown admitted many years later it was one of the biggest regrets in his coaching career but said he had moved on from the incident.

Following a Round 12, 2006 game against the Newcastle Knights, Barrett received a grade-five striking charge on Newcastle Knights' Brian Carney. The incident initially went unnoticed throughout the entire weekend but it is understood a Channel Nine producer picked up the incident. Barrett was suspended for six matches, ruling him out of Dally M Medal contention.

Barrett had two years left on his St. George Illawarra Dragons contract, but a get-out clause enabled him to quit the club for a move to England. He signed a three-year deal with the Wigan Warriors on 4 May 2006, despite their position at the bottom of the Super League and the threat of relegation to National League Division 1.

Barrett made his Wigan Warriors début in a 16–10 defeat against Warrington at the JJB Stadium on 9 February 2007. In October 2007, Barrett was named as the Rugby League Players' Player of the Year but missed out on the "Man of Steel" although he had been tipped to be named. James Roby of St Helens received the award.

Following a release from the final year of his three-year contract with Wigan, Barrett signed with the Cronulla-Sutherland Sharks in June 2008, on a two-year deal, commencing in 2009.

He earned the five-eighth spot for the New South Wales team in the 2nd State of Origin match that year. In his Origin comeback, Barrett was charged following a reckless tackle on Queensland's Greg Inglis, and as a result was suspended for two club matches. It did not, however, deter him from playing in the third and final Origin match in which he set up several tries as NSW defeated Queensland in the dead rubber, Queensland having won the series with victory three weeks prior. Barrett announced his retirement on 22 July 2010.

Statistics

Representative games 
"Club:" Played 199 games for the Illawarra Steelers and the St George Illawarra Dragons
Country: Played for Country in City vs Country Origin
State of Origin: Played 11 games in total for New South Wales
International: Played 13 tests to date for Australia including the 2000 World Cup

Awards 
Dally M: Dally M Player of the Year in 2000
 Super League Players' Player of the Year 2007

Post-playing
On 5 April 2014, Barrett was announced as the new head coach of the Italian national rugby league team when previous coach Carlo Napolitano announced his departure after Italy's 2013 Rugby League World Cup campaign. He coached Italy in their World Cup Qualifying matches, while Paul Broadbent coached Italy in the minor European Championship competitions.

In 2016, Trent Barrett became the head coach for Manly-Warringah Sea Eagles. In Barrett's first season as Manly coach the club finished 13th on the table and missed the finals.  The following season, Barrett took Manly to a 6th-place finish on the table and qualified for the finals but were eliminated in controversial circumstances against Penrith in week one of the finals.

In 2018, Manly and Barrett suffered a horror year on and off the field with the club finishing second last and narrowly avoiding the wooden spoon. The club was also plagued with infighting and there were reported disagreements between Barrett and the Manly owners over lack of chairs and whose responsibility it was to provide them. Trent eventually supplied the chairs himself but the effort was too late to save the season.

On 22 October 2018, Manly announced that former two-time premiership-winning coach Des Hasler would be appointed as the new Manly head coach for 2019 despite the fact that Barrett still had 12 months remaining on his contract and was not officially terminated by the club.

On 6 August 2019, Barrett spoke to the media and said that in some way he deserved credit for Manly's form reversal in 2019 which saw the club go from finishing second last in 2018 to contenders the following season.  Barrett said "I’d actually like to think I left them well-educated, A few of the boys I got there like Siro (Curtis Sironen) were coming out of reserve grade, No one else wanted Moses Suli. He’d been punted by the Wests Tigers and the Bulldogs, Tommy Turbo had only played five games when I started".

Barrett's comments were later slammed online by the daughter of Bob Fulton, Kirstie Fulton took to Facebook and wrote "History will not be rewritten, no way. I sit back and watch and read people take credit for many things and it’s hard to digest at times because I know who has been and continues to be instrumental in driving a lot of the change behind the scenes but I won’t accept this at all. Is he kidding? His arrogance and ego nearly tore the place apart".

On 16 August 2019, it was announced that Barrett would be returning to Penrith as assistant coach to Ivan Cleary beginning in 2020.

On 23 July 2020, it was announced that Barrett would be the head coach of Canterbury-Bankstown from 2021 onwards on a three-year deal.  Barrett began his head coaching role with an opening round defeat against Newcastle.  In round 2 & 3 of the 2021 NRL season, Canterbury were kept scoreless by Penrith and Brisbane losing 28-0 and 24-0 respectively.  This was the first time in the club's history they had been held scoreless in consecutive games.

In round 4 of the 2021 NRL season, Canterbury were defeated 38-0 by South Sydney in the traditional Good Friday game.  Canterbury became only the second team in the NRL era to lose three straight games without scoring a point after Cronulla who achieved this in the 2014 NRL season.
It was also the worst start to a season by any team since Glebe in the 1928 NSWRFL season who managed to only score 12 points in their first four matches.
In round 7 of the 2021 NRL season, Barrett earned his first win as Canterbury-Bankstown head coach after the club snapped a six-game losing streak to beat Cronulla-Sutherland 18–12.

In round 16 of the 2021 NRL season, Canterbury were defeated 66-0 by Manly-Warringah. It was Canterbury's third biggest defeat in their 86-year history. At the end of the 2021 NRL season, Canterbury finished last on the table and claimed their sixth Wooden Spoon after winning only three matches all year.

On 16 May 2022, Barrett resigned from his role as head coach of the Canterbury-Bankstown Bulldogs.
Barrett finished his tenure with the second lowest win percentage of any Canterbury coach since the clubs foundation in 1935 with 15.2 percent, only inaugural head coach Tedda Courtney had a lower win percentage with 12.5 percent.

On 18 August 2022, Barrett signed with the Parramatta Eels as an assistant coach, starting in 2023.

Footnotes

External links

Manly Sea Eagles profile
NRL profile
 Trent Barrett Wigan Career Page on the Wigan RL Fansite.
 Super League profile
 2001 Ashes profile
 State of Origin Official website Rugby League Player Stats

1977 births
Living people
Australia national rugby league team players
Australian rugby league coaches
Country New South Wales Origin rugby league team players
Country New South Wales rugby league team coaches
Cronulla-Sutherland Sharks players
Illawarra Steelers players
Italy national rugby league team coaches
Manly Warringah Sea Eagles coaches
New South Wales Rugby League State of Origin captains
New South Wales Rugby League State of Origin players
Rugby league five-eighths
Rugby league players from Temora, New South Wales
St. George Illawarra Dragons players
Wigan Warriors players